The FIL World Luge Championships 1996 took place in Altenberg, Germany.

Men's singles

Women's singles

Men's doubles

Mixed team

Medal table

References
Men's doubles World Champions
Men's singles World Champions
Mixed teams World Champions
Women's singles World Champions

FIL World Luge Championships
1996 in luge
1996 in German sport
International luge competitions hosted by Germany